Senator Camden may refer to:

Gideon D. Camden (1805–1891), Virginia judge and later West Virginia State Senator, uncle of Johnson N. Camden
Johnson N. Camden Jr. (1865–1942), U.S. Senator from Kentucky
Johnson N. Camden (1828–1908), U.S. Senator from West Virginia from 1881 to 1887